William Matthew Noveskey (born June 16, 1976 in Adrian, Michigan, USA) is an American singer, songwriter, record producer, guitarist, and bassist, best known as the bassist in the bands Blue October and Harvard of the South, and as bassist and frontman of the bands (a+)machines and Icarus Bell.

Early life
Noveskey moved from Adrian to Traverse City at the age of ten. He grew up in a very musical household in Northern Michigan. He had two uncles who both played bass guitar and sang in touring rock bands, his brother plays drums, and his grandparents played guitar, piano and accordion. Inspired by his uncle Jim Noveskey, Matt started playing bass at age eleven and has been playing in bands since he was a teenager. Matt has said that he was interested in playing both drums and guitar, and that playing bass sort of allowed him to do both at the same time. His first band was called Love Muscle and he also played in the bands Terra Firma, Eat Some Tuna, and Toast, the latter of which included his brother, Dave Irish, on drums. His early musical influences were bassists Geddy Lee, James Jamerson, Larry Graham, and Flea.

Noveskey graduated from Saint Francis High School in Traverse City in 1994. He attended college at University of Michigan in Ann Arbor and Western Michigan University in Kalamazoo, first majoring in English, and later in elementary education. He bartended while playing weekend shows with a variety of local acts, including the bands Switch and Botfly. Acting on a tip from his booking agent, in late 1998 he successfully auditioned for Blue October and moved to San Marcos, Texas.  His first full show with Blue October was at Satellite Lounge in Houston, Texas on February 12, 1999.

Blue October

Noveskey joined Blue October in 1998 after the departure of the group's original bassist, Liz Mullally. Noveskey played guitar, bass and sang backing vocals on Blue October's 2000 major label debut Consent to Treatment. He also created the artwork for the album and along with Justin Furstenfeld, co-wrote the single "James" and the live fan-favorite "You Make Me Smile."

Noveskey toured extensively with Blue October in support of Consent to Treatment. He stayed with the band even after they were dropped from Universal Records, but left due to health reasons at the end of the tour in late 2002. Blue October re-signed with Universal for the release of 2003's History for Sale on which Noveskey contributed. Matt eventually fully rejoined Blue October in late 2004. During his absence, Blue October never played the Noveskey-penned "You Make Me Smile" during a concert. The song was included as the opening track on the band's 2006 platinum album Foiled and is now a live staple.

After the departure of Blue October's lead guitarist, C.B. Hudson, in 2010, Noveskey temporarily took over guitar duty during performances until the band hired Julian Mandrake as a full-time lead guitarist.

(a+)machines
During his absence from Blue October, Noveskey formed a second band with Blue October's drum technician Alan Adams, who had previously been the drummer for the bands Falling Jupiter and Flywater Washington. The new band, (a+)machines, also includes Ryan Holley and Chris Lynch. Noveskey is the primary singer and lyricist in the band, which have recorded a 5-track EP and a live album. The band actively toured during 2004 and 2005 with such acts as Canvas, SouthFM, 7 Mary 3, Vallejo and the Burden Brothers, and even opened for Blue October. They also played an official showcase at SXSW in 2005. The group have been on hiatus while Noveskey and Adams tour with Blue October. (a+)machines has periodically reunited to play live concerts. Their most recent show was October 27, 2018 in Austin.

Icarus Bell
In 2019 Matt started working with Alan Adams on a new musical project called Icarus Bell. With the COVID-19 pandemic sidelining Blue October's tour plans, Matt was able to devote more focus to Icarus Bell. The duo began recording their debut album in 2020, which features contributions from Paco Estrada, Scott Graham, Ron "Bumblefoot" Thal, Lukas Rossi, Kelsey Flanagan, Justin Furstenfeld, Will Knaak and Ryan Delahoussaye, among others. Icarus Bell released their debut single "Aces" in December 2020. In June 2021 Icarus Bell's music video for their song "Vultures" received a bronze Addy award from the Austin chapter of the American Advertising Federation. They plan to release their debut album in 2023.

Other music projects
While not touring and recording with his bands, Noveskey lends his services as a bassist, songwriter, vocalist and record producer for other recording artists in a variety of musical genres Noveskey started producing other artists in 2006, and in January 2008 he formed a production company called 116 Producers with producer/engineer Chuck Alkazian. The duo mainly worked out of Detroit and Austin. Several of the artists Noveskey produced have signed to major labels, won awards, achieved chart success and had their songs placed in movies and television shows. Songs Noveskey has produced or co-written have charted at #1 on iTunes independent, #1 on iHeartRadio, Top 10 iTunes pop, Top 20 iTunes overall, Top 30 Alternative, Top 40 Adult Contemporary, and Top 30 Hot Country Songs.

In addition to producing, Noveskey is the proprietor of Wanderlust Artist Management and Promotion, a company that manages and promotes the artists he produces. His current roster includes the bands I Am Dynamite, Dossey and Courrier. Matt also manages Dalton Rapattoni who finished third on American Idol, and he also produced Rapattoni's debut solo album Nobody's Home. In 2012 Noveskey along with Blue October's guitarist C.B. Hudson, broke ground on Orb Recording Studios, a world class residential recording studio in Austin, which opened in 2013.  In 2014 Orb Studios was selected as Austin's best recording studio in the Austin Music Industry Awards.

Noveskey also tours as a solo artist, often sharing the stage with friends and bandmates such as Justin Furstenfeld, Joseph King, Jeff Crowder, Wesley Lunsford, Ryan Holley, Casey McPherson, Paco Estrada and Johnny Goudie.  Matt's solo sets contain a mix of his solo songs, (a+)machines songs, Blue October songs and covers.  He is often accompanied by his (a+)machines bandmate Ryan Holley.

In 2014, Noveskey joined the band Harvard of the South with Steve Schiltz of Longwave and Justin and Jeremy Furstenfeld of Blue October. Harvard of the South released their long-awaited debut album in December 2020.  Matt has also toured and played shows as a live member of The Paco Estrada Band, Megan Becker Band, and Alpha Rev. He produced and played bass on Paco Estrada's album Bedtime Stories and also played bass on Estrada's live album Dancing With The Devil, both of which were recorded at Noveskey's Orb Studios. Matt also plays bass in the Ryan Delahoussaye-fronted side project The Meeting Place.

Noveskey is a celebrity endorser of Fender basses, Aguilar bass amps, Michael Kelly acoustic basses, Old School FX pedals and Black Diamond strings, and the first Moniker bass guitar was custom-built for Noveskey in 2013.  He also is a member of the advisory board for Black Fret, an Austin-based organization that finds and funds local music talent.

In 2019 Noveskey became a member of industrial/punk/hard rock supergroup The Joy Thieves.

In 2021 Premiere Career Guidance (PCG), a Nashville-based artist development company, announced their expansion into the Austin market, and the appointment of Matt Noveskey as head of their Austin division. In 2022 Noveskey was added to the roster of Los Angeles-based Waldman Management as a producer/songwriter.

Artist discography
With Blue October
Consent to Treatment (2000)
History for Sale (2003)
Foiled (2006)
Teach Your Baby Well Live (2007)
Approaching Normal (2009)
Ugly Side: An Acoustic Evening With Blue October (2011)
Any Man in America (2011)
Sway (2013)
Things We Do at Night (Live from Texas) (2015)
Home (2016)
I Hope You're Happy (2018)
Live from Manchester (2018)
This Is What I Live For (2020)
Spinning the Truth Around (Part 1) (2022)
Spinning the Truth Around (Part 2) (2023)

With (a+)machines
(a+)machines EP (2004)
Live @ Momo's (2006)

With Harvard of the South
Miracle EP (2014)
Harvard of the South LP (2020)

Producer discography
Five Dollar Friend - XOXORx (Kisses, Hugs, and Prescription Drugs) (2006)
Darby - The Clearing (2007)
Dawn Over Zero - Catapult (2007)
Wesley Lunsford (& The Selfless Season) - The Mixlab Demonstration (2007)
I Am Dynamite - Mahoney (2008)
Emphatic - Goodbye Girl (2009)
Language Room - One By One (2009)
Courrier - A Violent Flame (2010)
Deep Ella - You. me. and the Spider (2010)
Gravity - Gravity (2010)
Language Room - Language Room (2010)
Wesley Lunsford (& The Selfless Season) - The Selfless Season (2010)
23 Shades - A New Day to Learn (2011)
Booth - Booth (2011)
Brannigan - Lucky Sound (2011)
Giants in the Earth - The Drug II (2011)
Jesse Felder - What's Underneath (2011)
I Am Dynamite - SuperMegaFantastic (2011)
Manna - Chronic Hives (2011)
Courrier - Love is a Fire (2012)
Little Brave - Wild (2012)
Moonlight Social - Heading South (2012)
Penni - Eleven Stories Down (2012)
Snake Skin Prison - Smokin Whiskey (2012)
The Strive - Design the Road (2012)
Cody Bryan Band - Wreck Me (2013)
Edison Chair - Edison Chair (2013)
Joshua Radin - Wax Wings (2013)
Reed Turner - Ghosts in the Attic (2013)
Swimming With Bears - Paw (2013)
Tori Vasquez - Wear You Thin (2013)
Waterloo Revival- (ep) (2013)
Wesley Lunsford (& The Selfless Season) - Wesley Lunsford (2013)
TheLastPlaceYouLook - TheLastPlaceYouLook (2013)
Vinyl Pilot - A Beautiful Disaster (2013)
KIONA - Midnight Holiday (2014)
Quiet Company - Transgressor (2015)
Paco Estrada - Bedtime Stories (2015)
Tori Vasquez - [new album] (2015)
I Am Dynamite - Wasa Tusa (2015)
Reed Turner - Native Tongue (2015)
Cody Bryan Band - Small Town Noise (2015)
Fly Away Hero - Lost and Found (2015)
Daryll "DMC' McDaniels - [new album] (2016)
Cavo - Bridges (2016)
Ivory Tribes - Jungles (2016)
Soapbox Revolution - (ep) (2016)
Alpha Rev - (ep) (2015)
Nomad City - (ep) (2016)
Jibe - Epic Tales of Human Nature (2017)
Dalton Rapattoni - Nobody's Home (2017)
Tje Austin - I Belong to You (2017)
Nakayla - Queen of Hearts (2018)
Adri Lavigne - Take Me Home (2019)
Hold on Hollywood - Love Stories (2020)
Big Story - BEAZT (2020)
James Mackenzie - The Honeymoon (2020)
Elijah Delgado - Grow (2020)
Lia Catallo - In My Fantasies (2020)
Dossey - Animal (2021)
Ellie Reed - Sunsets and Silver Linings (2021)
In The Trench - Nightmares EP (2021)

References

External links
Matt Novesky: Inside the Gear Room
Warwick Bass
Blue October: Q&A with Matt Noveskey
Blue October's perseverance starts paying dividends
Matt Noveskey
Blue October interview by Nick Stephenson
Blue October Plays Austin for Two Nights in November

1976 births
Living people
Alternative rock bass guitarists
Alternative rock singers
American alternative rock musicians
American male singers
Record producers from Texas
American rock bass guitarists
American male bass guitarists
American rock guitarists
American male guitarists
American rock singers
Blue October members
Singers from Michigan
Musicians from Austin, Texas
Writers from Austin, Texas
People from Traverse City, Michigan
Songwriters from Michigan
Songwriters from Texas
Guitarists from Michigan
Guitarists from Texas
21st-century American singers
21st-century American bass guitarists